"Saved Me" is a song by New Zealand musician, Jenny Morris. It was released in June 1989 the lead single from her second studio album, Shiver (1989).

Track listings
 CD Single/ 7" (WEA 7–257528)
 "Saved Me" – 3:46	
 "Drown" – 3:32

 Remixes (WEA 903171563–0)
 "Saved Me"  (UK Shiver Mix)  – 5:30
 "Saved Me"   (UK Shake Mix)  – 3:48
 "Self Deceiver"   (Extended Mix)  – 3:45

Charts

References

1989 songs
1989 singles
Jenny Morris (musician) songs
Songs written by Andrew Farriss